Chikola may refer to:
Chikola, Russia, a rural locality (a selo) in the Republic of North Ossetia–Alania, Russia
Chikola (Dodoma Rural ward), a Tanzanian ward in Dodoma Rural region
Chikola (Manyoni ward), a Tanzanian ward in Manyoni region